David Ferrer was the three-time defending champion, but he chose to compete in Acapulco instead.
Rafael Nadal won the title, defeating Juan Mónaco in the final, 6–4, 6–1.

Seeds

 Rafael Nadal (champion)
 Tommy Robredo (quarterfinals)
 Pablo Cuevas (quarterfinals)
 Fabio Fognini (second round)
 Leonardo Mayer (second round)
 Jiří Veselý (first round)
 Pablo Andújar (first round)
 Pablo Carreño Busta (first round, retired)

Draw

Finals

Top half

Bottom half

Qualifying

Seeds

 Facundo Bagnis (qualified)
 Facundo Argüello (qualified)
 Roberto Carballés Baena (second round)
 Marco Cecchinato (qualified)
 Guido Pella (first round)
 Nicolás Jarry (first round)
 Marco Trungelliti (first round)
 Gonzalo Lama (second round)

Qualifiers

Qualifying draw

First qualifier

Second qualifier

Third qualifier

Fourth qualifier

External links
 Main draw
 Qualifying draw

Argentina Open - Singles
ATP Buenos Aires